Richard Paul Snyder (born 1960) is a retired United States Navy vice admiral who last served as the 41st Naval Inspector General. Previously, he was the director of strategy, plans, and policy of the United States Northern Command. Snyder earned a B.S. degree in management from Tulane University in 1983. He was designated a naval aviator in November 1984. Snyder later received an M.S. degree in operations research from the Naval Postgraduate School.

References

1960 births
Living people
Place of birth missing (living people)
Tulane University alumni
United States Naval Aviators
Naval Postgraduate School alumni
Recipients of the Legion of Merit
United States Navy admirals
Recipients of the Defense Superior Service Medal
United States Navy Inspectors General